Short Circuit is a series of American independent animated short films produced by Walt Disney Animation Studios. Similar to the SparkShorts program launched at sister animation studio Pixar, the series is a program in which the employees pitch their ideas for a short and work with fellow employees to create the short if selected, and is meant to take risks in both visual styles and storytelling. The shorts were streamed exclusively on Disney+ on January 24, 2020. A second cycle of animated shorts premiered on August 4, 2021.

Development 
Development on the Short Circuit program began in 2016. Similar to sister animation studio Pixar's SparkShorts, Walt Disney Animation Studios launched a program named Short Circuit, consisting of a series of shorts of an experimental nature where any employee working at the studio can pitch an idea and can make a short if selected. In a statement, Disney said that "[t]he goal of this innovative program is to take risks in both visual style and story, surface new voices at the studio, and experiment with new technical innovation". The first short released under the program is Cycles, directed by Jeff Gipson, which is Disney's first VR short.

Episodes

Season 1 (2020)

Season 2 (2021–22)

Unaired shorts

Release 
Short Circuits first three shorts, Exchange Student, Jing Hua, and Just a Thought, premiered at Annecy. Later shorts were played at the El Capitan Theatre, attached to The Lion King in selected screenings. The shorts were screened at the D23 Expo. The shorts were publicly released on January 24, 2020, on Disney+. Unlike most original Disney+ content, the shorts were released all at once, instead of being released on a weekly basis.

One day after its release, the short Drop was temporarily removed from the service, due to technical issues with the intro to the short. It has since been added back.

Notes

References 

Animated short film series
Film series introduced in 2020
Disney animated short films
Disney animated television series
Disney+ original programming